Gordon Ramsay's Home Cooking is a British television programme which Scottish chef, Gordon Ramsay, "teaches viewers how to cook simple, tasty, amazing food every day". It aired for a single season of 20 episodes on Channel 4 in October and November 2013. Unlike Gordon Ramsay's Ultimate Cookery Course, the show's name implies his family getting involved, such as his wife Tana and daughter Tilly.

Episode Guide

References

External links
 

2013 British television series debuts
2013 British television series endings
Channel 4 original programming
British cooking television shows
Television series by All3Media
English-language television shows